Alexander Chekmenev (Oleksandr Chekmenov) (born April 1, 1969)  is a Ukrainian documentary photographer and photojournalist based in Kyiv.

Career 
Chekmenev made his first photo while in school, attended a photoclub and later got a professional certificate from a licensed photo studio in Luhansk in 1988.

He worked for a studio in Luhansk and did small time jobs taking pictures of weddings, birthdays and other occasions. He also occasionally volunteered as a forensic photographer for an ambulance brigade in the city.

In 1997 he was invited to a Kiyv-based daily newspaper as a photojournalist and moved to Kyiv. In 1998 the newspaper ceased operation, Chekmenev became a freelancer and has been working as an independent photojournalist ever since. Today he works as a photojournalist 

His first book was called simply Black and White Photographs and was published in 2008 in Kyiv as a part of series on Ukrainian photography. In 2011 Alexander made a private print of his book Donbass in Germany. Chekmenev created a series of portraits of protestors, called Warriors, as they emerged from the street battles of Euromaidan. His next book Passport was based on his work of 1994/95 and was published in the UK in 2017.

Publications

Publications by Chekmenev 

 Black and White Photographs. Kyiv: Artbook, 2008. . Ukrainian/English. Edition of 1000 copies.
 Donbass. Heidelberg: Kehrer, 2011. Edited by Andrej Krementschouk. . German/English/Russian.
 Passport. Stockport: Dewi Lewis, 2017. . Edition of 1000 copies.
 Lilies. Museum of Kharkiv School of Photography, 2020. Photography and text by Chekmenev. Edited by Sergiy Lebedynskyy. . Ukrainian/English. Edition of 550 copies.
Pharmakon: Ambulance in Luhansk 1994–1995. Palermo: 89books, 2021. . With an essay by Donald Weber.

Publications with others 
 Insight. Ukrainian black and white photography in the XXI century. 2008.

Collections 
 Museum of Kharkiv School of Photography, Kharkiv, Ukraine (245 prints from various series)
 Museum Ludwig, Cologne, Germany (15 prints from the Passport series)
 Mystetskyi Arsenal National Art and Culture Museum Complex, Kyiv, Ukraine (prints from the Passport series)
 Märkisches Museum, Witten, Germany (2 prints from the Donbass series)

Solo exhibitions 

 Ukrainian Passport, Lilac series, City art gallery in Poprad, Slovakia, 2000
 Ukrainian Passport, Lilac, The Blind, Easter, Portraits, The Miners, City art gallery in Olsztyn, Poland, 2001
 Donbass, Perm Museum of Contemporary Art, Perm, Russia, 2010
 Donbass, Witten, Germany, 2013
 Donbass, Pálffy Palace, Bratislava, Slovakia, 2015
 Donbass, Passport, Blue Sky Gallery, Portland, OR, 2016
 Donbass, Märkisches Museum, Witten, Germany, 2018

See also
 Serhii Korovayny

References

Works cited

External links 

 "Ukrainian Servicemen", The New Yorker, 2014

1969 births
Living people
People from Luhansk
Ukrainian photographers
Moscow State University alumni